Maxime Vuille (born 2 November 1987 in Morteau) is a Swiss footballer, who last played for League of Ireland club Shamrock Rovers B. Besides Switzerland, he has played in the Republic of Ireland.

Career

The midfielder played four games for Neuchâtel Xamax in the Swiss Super League. On 11 January 2010 left Neuchâtel Xamax after ten years to sign with Challenge League club FC Biel-Bienne.

Vuille made guest appearances for Shamrock Rovers in friendlies against Wolves and QPR in the summer of 2014 at Tallaght Stadium.

References

1987 births
Living people
Swiss men's footballers
Neuchâtel Xamax FCS players
Shamrock Rovers F.C. guest players
Shamrock Rovers F.C. players
League of Ireland players
Swiss expatriate footballers
Expatriate association footballers in the Republic of Ireland
Association football midfielders